Die Männer vom K3 is a German television series.

External links
 

German crime television series
1980s German police procedural television series
1990s German police procedural television series
2000s German police procedural television series
1990s German television series
1988 German television series debuts
2003 German television series endings
Television shows set in Hamburg
German-language television shows
Das Erste original programming